Alliance Bank may refer to:

 Alliance Bank Malaysia Berhad
 Alliance Bank of Simla, Himachal Pradesh, India
 Alliance Bank, an associate organisation of Bendigo and Adelaide Bank, Australia

It may also refer to:

 Alliance & Leicester, United Kingdom
 Alliance Bank Building, Alliance, Ohio
 Alliance Bank Stadium, Syracuse, New York
 Alliance Bank Golf Classic, Syracuse, New York
 First Alliance Bank Zambia Limited

See also 
 NBT Bank, New York